Gatab-e Shomali Rural District is a rural district (dehestan) in Gatab District, Babol County, Mazandaran Province, Iran. At the 2006 census, its population was 23,405, in 5,909 families. The rural district has 30 villages.

References 

Rural Districts of Mazandaran Province
Babol County